Fluid-attenuated inversion recovery (FLAIR) is an MRI sequence with an inversion recovery set to null fluids. For example, it can be used in brain imaging to suppress cerebrospinal fluid (CSF) effects on the image, so as to bring out the periventricular hyperintense lesions, such as multiple sclerosis (MS) plaques. It was invented by Graeme Bydder.  FLAIR can be used with both three-dimensional imaging (3D FLAIR) or two dimensional imaging (2D FLAIR).

Technique
By carefully choosing the inversion time (TI), the signal from any particular tissue can be nulled. The appropriate TI depends on the tissue via the formula:

in other words, one should typically use a TI of around 70% of the T1 value. In the case of CSF suppression, one aims for T1-weighted images, which prioritize the signal of fat over that of water. Therefore, if the long TI (inversion time) is adjusted to a zero crossing point for water (none of its signal is visible), the signal of the CSF is theoretically being "erased," from the derived image.

Clinical applications 
The FLAIR sequence analysis has been especially useful in the evaluation and study of CNS disorders, involving:
 Lacunar infarction
 Multiple sclerosis (MS) plaques
 Subarachnoid haemorrhage
 Head trauma
 Meningitis and other leptomeningeal diseases*
* Post-contrast FLAIR images have been added to diagnosis protocol for accurate medical assessment.

See also
Relaxation (NMR)

References

Further reading

 
 

Magnetic resonance imaging